National Route 1, also known as National Route 1A, is the trans-Vietnam highway. The route begins at km 0 at Hữu Nghị Quan Border Gate near the China-Vietnam border, runs the length of the country connecting major cities including Hanoi, Da Nang and Ho Chi Minh City, and ends at km 2301.34 at Năm Căn township in Cà Mau Province.

Road layout
National Route 1 runs across provinces and cities of Vietnam:

Lạng Sơn (km 16)
Bắc Giang (km 119)
Bắc Ninh (km 139)
City of Hanoi (the capital) (km 170)
Phủ Lý (km 229, Province of Hà Nam)
Ninh Bình (km 263)
Thanh Hóa (km 323)
Vinh (km 461, Nghệ An)
Hà Tĩnh (km 510)
Đồng Hới (km 658, province of Quảng Bình)
Đông Hà (km 750, province of Quảng Trị)
City of Huế (km 824, province of Thừa Thiên–Huế)
City of Da Nang (km 929)
Tam Kỳ (km 991, province of Quảng Nam)
Quảng Ngãi (km 1054)
via 1D: Quy Nhơn (km 1232, province of Bình Định)
Tuy Hòa (km 1329, province of Phú Yên)
via 1C: Nha Trang (km 1450, province of Khánh Hòa)
Phan Rang–Tháp Chàm (km 1528, province of Ninh Thuận)
Phan Thiết (km 1701, province of Bình Thuận)
Biên Hòa (km 1867, province of Đồng Nai)
Ho Chi Minh City (km 1889)
Tân An (km 1936, province of Long An)
Mỹ Tho (km 1959, province of Tiền Giang)
Vĩnh Long (km 2024)
Cần Thơ City (km 2058)
Hậu Giang Province
Sóc Trăng (km 2119, province of Sóc Trăng)
Bạc Liêu (km 2176)
Cà Mau (km 2236, province of Cà Mau)

Specifications
Total length 2,300.45 km 
Road width: 10–12 m
Road surface: paved with asphalt
Total bridges: 874 bridges, bridge load varies from 25 to 30 metric tonnes

History

The National Route 1 was constructed by the French colonists in early 20th century. It has been upgraded recently by Japanese ODA as well as loans from World Bank. During both the First Indochina War and Second Indochina War (the Vietnam War), Road 1A was the site of a number of battles between Vietnamese forces and French or American troops. One of the most notable engagements was the French Operation Camargue in 1953.

During the Republic of Vietnam regime (1954-1975), there are two divided sections of the main highway from Quang Tri to Ba Xuyen (Ca Mau): QL-1 (National Highway 1) and QL-4 (National Highway 4). Extensive upgrade work was done on the QL-1, and QL-19 by the U.S. Army Corps of Engineers during the 2nd Indo China War. In 1966 the 19th Engineer Battalion began to "upgrade highway QL-1 from virtually a dirt trail, to a class 31 all-weather road, from Qui Nhon north to Bong Son." By 1970, the QL-1 had been upgraded all the way to Mo Duc. QL-1 bypass the route around Saigon-Bien Hoa. In the Mekong Delta, NH4 (now National Highway 1A) stretches distance of Long An province to Ba Xuyen (Ca Mau) province.

Future
The central section of the highway, from Hanoi to Cần Thơ, is planned to be duplicated by the North-South Expressway.

References

AH1
1